Amar Oak; is an Indian classical and light music flautist.He is Famous from the Marathi singing reality show on Zee Marathi SA RE GA MA PA.He also performs a commeracial  Show " Amar Bansi " which is based on his flute playing.

Early life
A Master's degree holder in Computer Science. He took in music from Mr. Sane and Mr. Bhave , and then seeking guidance from Late Pt.Satchidanand Phadke & Late Pt.Sudhir Phadke.
He was the first person in the family who learnt flute from his father.

Career
He has performed with renowned artists such as  Hridaynath Mangeshkar, Asha Bhosle, Hariharan, and Shankar Mahadevan.

Oak is also working with the youth icons like Avdhoot Gupte, Swapnil Bandodkar, Vaishali Samant, Ajay - Atul, Saleel Kulkarni and many more.

Oak has also performed with stalwarts like Tabla maestro Zakir Hussain, Suresh Wadkar (Singer) and Ghazal maestro Ustd.Ghulam Ali (singer).

Performances
 Program "Swarali" by Shekhar Mahamuni
 Accompanied in orchestra/groups like Awaaz ki Duniya, Gane Suhane, Azaadi Pachaas, Manik Moti, Marathi Bana and various other theme based shows.
 Spell with his flute in Z Marathi ’s "Sur Taal "
 Performed in channel events such Nakshatranche Dene
 Musical notes in J.P Wasvani's ‘Religious Discourse’ on Sony TV
 Performed as indispensable artist by actively performing in Zee Marathi's "Sa Re Ga Ma Pa"
 A musical album "Pyar Mohabbat" released by ‘The Times Group’
 Composed the music for a ballet, "Krishna Ranga."
 Performs in unique concept based programs with stalwarts like Shounak Abhisheki (Swar Sangam) and Anand Bhate (Swar Bahar)
 Kumar Gandharva Mahotsav, Chiplun
 Chaturang Pratishthan, Mumbai

Contribution in Music Albums
 Sumiran – sung by Lata Mangeshkar, music directed by Pt. Hridaynath Mangeshkar
 Mangal Murti Ganesh – sung by Asha Bhosale, music directed by Kedar Pandit
 Surdas – Composed by composed & sung by renowned classical singer Mrs. Ashwini-Bhide Deshpande
 Hridayatlya Gane – composed by Mr. Salil Kulkarni and sung by Ms. Bela Shende
 Pancharatna – by Zee TV
 Sparshaganda – by Kamlesh Bhadkamkar
 Bhakticha Mala – sung by Yadneshwar Limbekar
 Tuzya Vina - Composed By Prasad phatak and sung by Anweshaa 
 Sajan Ghar Aao re - Composed By Prasad phatak and sung by Anweshaa 
 Man He Vede ka Punha - Composed By Jeevan Marathe and sung by Anweshaa produced by Shrinivas G. Kulkarni

Programs 
 Amar bansi
 Golden Flute
 Swar Bahar
 Swar Sangam

Awards
 Recipient of the 'Sudhir Phadke Yuvonmesh Puraskar' awarded by 'Indradhanu, Thane' in 2007
 'Vocational Excellence Award 2009 - 2010 given by the Rotary Club of Nigdi, Pune
 Swargia Ram Kadam Puraskar" in October 2010 from Hridaynath Mangeshkar
 "The FIE Foundation" Award (National Award Category) of the year 2009-2010
 Pannalal Ghosh Award
 'Maitra Yuva' Puraskar '
 Vocational Excellence Award 2012 - 2013 given by Rotary Club Of Thane Central
 Vadan Gaurav Puraskar

References

Hindustani instrumentalists
Indian flautists
Living people
Musicians from Pune
Bansuri players
Indian male classical musicians
Year of birth missing (living people)